No Sounds Are Out of Bounds is the fifteenth studio album by English ambient house duo the Orb. The album was released on 22 June 2018 via Cooking Vinyl. It includes contributions from Youth, Roger Eno, Hollie Cook, Guy Pratt, Jah Wobble, Gaudi, Roney FM and Michael Rendall.

Track listing

Charts

References

2018 albums
The Orb albums
Cooking Vinyl albums